Thomas Boothby-Skrymsher (1698–6 June 1751) was a British landowner and whig politician.

Born around 1698, he was the eldest son of Thomas Boothby and his first wife Elizabeth, daughter of Sir Charles Skrymsher. He was educated at Magdalen College, Oxford, matriculating on 16 March 1715 at the age of 16. He married Anne, the daughter of Sir Hugh Clopton, on 17 January 1721, through whom he became related to Robert Walpole. By this time he had taken the additional name of his maternal grandfather under the terms of his will.

Boothby-Skrymsher stood unsuccessfully as a whig for Leicester in the general election of 1722, but was returned in the same seat in a By-election on 27 January 1727. He served just eight months, being defeated in the general election held later that year. In 1736 he became register general of all trading ships belonging to Great Britain, a post that he held for three years. He died on 6 June 1751, leaving five sons and three daughters.

References

 

1698 births
1751 deaths
Alumni of Magdalen College, Oxford
Members of the Parliament of Great Britain for English constituencies
British MPs 1722–1727
Whig (British political party) MPs for English constituencies